SN 1996ah was a supernova located in the spiral galaxy NGC 5640 in the constellation of Camelopardalis. It was discovered on June 6, 1996 by American astronomer Jean Mueller, who was using the 1.2-m Oschin Schmidt telescope in the course of the second Palomar Sky Survey.

SN 1996ah had magnitude about 18 and was located 5" west and 1" south of the center of NGC 5640. It was classified as type Ia supernova.

See also 
 Supernova 
 NGC 5640
 Camelopardalis (constellation)

References

Supernovae
19960606
Camelopardalis (constellation)